Namyeong station is a ground-level metro station on Seoul Subway Line 1 in Galwol Dong, Yongsan-gu, Seoul, South Korea. Subways of Line 1 move on Gyeongbu Line from this station.  The station's sole exit offers access to a range of schools and Yongsan Railway Office.  Travel time from Namyeong Station to Incheon on Line 1 is 65 minutes.

Though not connected by transfer, Namyeong station is only a two- to three-minute walk from Sookmyung Women's University station or Samgakji station on Line 4 & Line 6. (Only for Samgakji station) (Line 6)

History
Namyeong station opened on August 15, 1974, with services on Line 1 to Incheon and Suwon.

References

External links
 Station information from Korail

Seoul Metropolitan Subway stations
Metro stations in Yongsan District
Railway stations opened in 1974